Aye Myat Mon is a Burmese politician who has been the MP of the Sagaing Region Hluttaw for Myaung Township  No. 1 constituency since the 2015 general election. She is a member of the National League for Democracy.

Political career
In the 2015 Myanmar general election, she contested the Sagaing Region Hluttaw from Myaung Township No. 1 parliamentary constituency and won a seat.

In the 2020 Myanmar general election, re-elect Sagaing Region Hluttaw MP for Myaung Township  No. 1 constituency but was not allowed to assume her seat due to a military coup.

References

1981 births
Living people
National League for Democracy politicians